Diluticupes is an extinct genus of beetle in the family Ommatidae.

Species 
 †Diluticupes applanatus Tan and Ren, 2009 - Daohugou, China, Callovian
 †Diluticupes crowsonae Jarzembowski et al., 2013 - Weald Clay, United Kingdom, Barremian
 †Diluticupes impressus Ren, 1995 - Lushangfen Formation, Yixian Formation, China, Aptian
 †Diluticupes magnus Tan and Ren, 2009 - Daohugou, China, Callovian
 †Diluticupes minor Ponomarenko, 2000 - Argun Formation, Russia, Aptian
 †Diluticupes validus Tan and Ren, 2009 - Daohugou, China, Callovian
 †Diluticupes yangshuwanziensis Jarzembowski et al., 2013 - Yixian Formation, China, Aptian

References 

Ommatidae
Prehistoric beetle genera